Saint Varus (Gr. Ούαρος) (died ca. 304, Alexandria, Egypt) was an early Christian saint, soldier and martyr.

Biography

According to his generally reliable and authentic Acts, he was a soldier stationed in Upper Egypt who had the task of guarding a group of 7 monks awaiting execution. It is stated that Varus was already a Christian at this point, but had weak faith. After witnessing one of the monks perish, the faith of Varus became reinvigorated, and he joined the monks. For this, Varus was tortured, and had his body hung from a tree.

Veneration

During the Time of Troubles, many children of Russian Orthodox families were dying before they could be baptized. This led Patriarch Hermogenes of Moscow to declare that the Canon of Saint Varus should be sung in churches on behalf of dead, unbaptized children. This makes Varus a popular saint in Russia, as he is remembered as an intercessor on behalf of the suffering Russian people.

See also

 Saint Cleopatra — witnessed the suffering and execution of Saint Varus.
 Lectionary 211
 October 19 (Eastern Orthodox liturgics)

External links and references
 The Life of Holy Martyr Varus. Reprinted From Orthodox Life Vol. 44, No5 - October 1994
 Catholic saints: St. Varus
 The Cult of St. Varus
 Varys the Martyr

4th-century Christian saints
Saints from Roman Egypt